The Queen's Birthday Party was a music concert held at the Royal Albert Hall in London on 21 April 2018 to celebrate the 92nd birthday of Queen Elizabeth II. Organised by the Royal Commonwealth Society, the event coincided with the end of the 2018 Commonwealth Heads of Government Meeting, which had taken place in the United Kingdom during the previous week. The concert was presented by radio and television presenter Zoë Ball and featured contemporary artists, as well as those from the worlds of classical music and jazz, all of whom are from countries that belong to the Commonwealth of Nations. Artists included Tom Jones, Kylie Minogue, Sting, Shaggy, Shawn Mendes, Anne-Marie, The George Formby Society  and Ladysmith Black Mambazo. Many of those who took part in the concert were accompanied by the BBC Concert Orchestra. The Queen was among concert attendees, along with other members of the Royal family. The concert was broadcast on BBC One and BBC Radio 2 in the UK and the Nine Network in Australia.

References

Concerts at the Royal Albert Hall
April 2018 events in the United Kingdom
2018 in British television
Entertainment in London
2018 in British music
2018 in London
2010s in the City of Westminster
Elizabeth II